The Belmar School District is a community public school district that serves students in pre-kindergarten through eighth grade from Belmar, in Monmouth County, New Jersey, United States.

The district also serves students from Lake Como who attend as part of a sending/receiving relationship. The school was constructed in 1909 and has had additions built in 1929, 1949, 1969 and 1993. There are 61 certified staff members, including the district's administrators, teachers, nurses and child study team personnel, with an additional 12 paraprofessionals. The single facility consists of two schools in one, a primary school for grades preschool through fifth and a middle school organization plan for grades six through eight.

As of the 2020–21 school year, the district, comprised of one school, had an enrollment of 448 students and 52.8 classroom teachers (on an FTE basis), for a student–teacher ratio of 8.5:1.

The district is classified by the New Jersey Department of Education as being in District Factor Group "DE", the fifth-highest of eight groupings. District Factor Groups organize districts statewide to allow comparison by common socioeconomic characteristics of the local districts. From lowest socioeconomic status to highest, the categories are A, B, CD, DE, FG, GH, I and J.

Students in ninth through twelfth grade are assigned based on sending/receiving relationships to either Manasquan High School or Asbury Park High School. Manasquan High School also serves students from Avon-by-the-Sea, Brielle, Lake Como, Sea Girt, Spring Lake, Spring Lake Heights who attend as part of sending/receiving relationships with their respective districts. As of the 2020–21 school year, Manasquan High School had an enrollment of 1,006 students and 76.9 classroom teachers (on an FTE basis), for a student–teacher ratio of 13.1:1, while Asbury Park High School had an enrollment of 682 students and 54.5 classroom teachers (on an FTE basis), for a student–teacher ratio of 12.5:1.

Students may also attend Red Bank Regional High School, Marine Academy of Science and Technology, Academy of Allied Health & Science, High Technology High School, Communications High School or Biotechnology High School. Another option is Academy Charter High School, located in Lake Como, which serves residents of Allenhurst, Asbury Park, Avon-by-the-Sea, Belmar, Bradley Beach, Deal, Interlaken and Lake Como, and accepts students on a lottery basis.

School
Belmar Elementary School served an enrollment of 437 students in grades PreK-8, as of the 2020–21 school year.
Sarah Wilton, Principal

Administration
Core members of the district's administration are:
Jimmy Alvarez, Superintendent
Michael Bardsley, Business Administrator / Board Secretary

Board of education
The district's board of education, comprised of nine members, sets policy and oversees the fiscal and educational operation of the district through its administration. As a Type II school district, the board's trustees are elected directly by voters to serve three-year terms of office on a staggered basis, with three seats up for election each year held (since 2012) as part of the November general election. The board appoints a superintendent to oversee the district's day-to-day operations and a business administrator to supervise the business functions of the district. Lake Como is also represented with a member of the Board of Education.

References

External links
Belmar School District
School Data for the Belmar School District, National Center for Education Statistics

Belmar Elementary School Weather Station

Belmar, New Jersey
Lake Como, New Jersey
New Jersey District Factor Group DE
School districts in Monmouth County, New Jersey
Public K–8 schools in New Jersey